The Drama Desk Award for Outstanding Revival is presented by the Drama Desk, a committee of New York City theatre critics, writers, and editors. It honors the Broadway, off-Broadway, off-off-Broadway, or legitimate not-for-profit theater revival of a production previously staged in New York City.

It was not until the 22nd Annual Drama Desk Awards in 1988 that a specific category for Outstanding Revival was created. The first recipient was The Royal Family, a play by George S. Kaufman and Edna Ferber that originally was staged in 1937. The award was not presented again until 1982. In 1993, the category was divided to give separate awards for plays and musicals.

Additional winners

1970s
 1976: The Royal Family
 What Every Woman Knows
 A Memory of Two Mondays / 27 Wagons Full of Cotton
 They Knew What They Wanted
 Trelawny of the 'Wells'
 Very Good Eddie
 Who's Afraid of Virginia Woolf?

1980s

 1982: Entertaining Mr. Sloane
 The Chalk Garden
 Misalliance
 1983: On Your Toes
 Vieux Carré
 The Cradle Will Rock
 All's Well That Ends Well
 Present Laughter
 The Caine Mutiny Court-Martial
 1984: Death of a Salesman
 The Philanthropist
 Serenading Louie
 Heartbreak House
 1985: A Day in the Death of Joe Egg
 On Approval
 Balm in Gilead
 Pacific Overtures
 Aren't We All?

 1986: The House of Blue Leaves
 Lemon Sky
 Long Day's Journey Into Night
 Loot
 The Iceman Cometh
 1988: Anything Goes
 Flora the Red Menace
 Lost in the Stars
 Dreamgirls
 Cabaret
 1989: Our Town
 Juno and the Paycock
 Long Day's Journey Into Night
 Sweeney Todd: The Demon Barber of Fleet Street

1990s

 1990: Gypsy
 The Sound of Music
 Cat on a Hot Tin Roof
 The Merchant of Venice
 1991: A Little Night Music
 Camille
 Hamlet
 Machinal

 1992: Guys and Dolls
 The Most Happy Fella
 'Tis Pity She's a Whore
 Falsettos

Revival